Giritale tank is a reservoir in Giritale and Minneriya. It was built by King Agbo II (608-618). It is believed that the tank was renovated by King Parakramabahu, the Great (1153–1186). Later, it was subjected to renovation in 1905, 1942 and 1952 during colonial era.

Giritale Tank was considered as the deepest tank in Sri Lanka during the rule of medieval capital Polonnaruwa.

References

External links 
 Giritale Tank

Bodies of water of Polonnaruwa District
Reservoirs in Sri Lanka
Lakes of Sri Lanka